Alexander Hamilton Jones (July 21, 1822 – January 29, 1901) was a Congressional Representative from North Carolina.

Jones was born in Buncombe County, North Carolina, where he completed his preparatory studies. He engaged in mercantile pursuits, and enlisted in the Union Army in 1863. He was captured in east Tennessee while raising a regiment of Union Volunteers and imprisoned, but made his escape November 14, 1864. He again joined the Union forces in Cumberland, Maryland. After the war, Jones returned to North Carolina and became a member of the State convention in 1865. He was elected as a Republican in November 1865 to the Thirty-ninth Congress, but was not permitted to qualify. Upon the readmission of North Carolina to representation, he was elected (in April 1868) to the Fortieth and Forty-first Congresses and served from July 6, 1868, to March 3, 1871. He was an unsuccessful candidate for reelection in 1870 to the Forty-second Congress.

Jones resided in Washington, D.C., until 1876, in Maryland until 1884, in Asheville, North Carolina, until 1890, and in Oklahoma until 1897, when he moved to California. He died in Long Beach, California, and was buried in Signal Hill Cemetery.

See also
List of solved missing person cases: pre-2000

References

 Retrieved on 2009-03-01

1822 births
1901 deaths
19th-century American politicians
American Civil War prisoners of war
American escapees
People from Buncombe County, North Carolina
Southern Unionists in the American Civil War
Union Army soldiers
People of North Carolina in the American Civil War
Republican Party members of the United States House of Representatives from North Carolina